José Rojas (born 9 November 1923) was a Mexican basketball player. He competed in the men's tournament at the 1948 Summer Olympics and the 1952 Summer Olympics.

References

External links
 

1923 births
Possibly living people
Mexican men's basketball players
Olympic basketball players of Mexico
Basketball players at the 1948 Summer Olympics
Basketball players at the 1952 Summer Olympics
People from Orizaba
Basketball players from Veracruz